The Floaters were an American R&B vocal group, from the Sojourner Truth housing projects in Detroit, Michigan, that formed in 1976. The group are best known for their 1977 song "Float On", which reached No. 2 on the Billboard Hot 100, No. 1 on the UK Singles Chart, and No. 5 on the Irish Singles Chart.

Career
The band was formed by the former Detroit Emeralds' singer James Mitchell, with his brother Paul Mitchell, Larry Cunningham, Charles Clark, and the unrelated Ralph Mitchell. Most of The Floaters were from Northeast Detroit, bordering Hamtramck on Detroit's Eastside.

James Mitchell wrote the band's one major hit, "Float On", with Arnold Ingram and Marvin Willis. The lyrics spotlight each member of the band, who introduced themselves with their name, astrological sign, and ideal type of romantic partner. The song was produced by Woody Wilson. It became a worldwide hit in 1977 on ABC Records, reaching No. 1 on the US R&B chart, No. 2 on the US Billboard Hot 100 chart, and No. 1 in the UK Singles Chart (for a single week in August that year).

Follow-ups such as "You Don't Have to Say You Love Me" (No. 28 Billboard R&B chart) were not as successful. The group continued to record, releasing four studio albums over the next few years.

A new recording of the song "Float On" was recorded in 2001 for the album, Still Standing, by the group Full Force and Cheech & Chong did a take-off of the song called "Bloat On".  The rap group Stetsasonic also did a cover of the song on In Full Gear (1988).  The characters from Sesame Street, David (Northern Calloway), Bob (Bob McGrath), Gordon (Roscoe Orman) and Luis (Emilio Delgado) did a style parody of the song called "Gimmie Five". British parody group The Barron Knights included a parody of "Float On" in their 1977 hit "Live in Trouble".

This song was also sampled by Canadian hip-hop recording duo Dream Warriors, in their song of the same name.

Larry Cunningham (born on June 23, 1951) died on January 10, 2019, at the age of 67.  Paul Mitchell (born on May 27, 1949) died on December 20, 2021, He was 72.

Discography

Studio albums

Compilation albums
Float On: The Best of the Floaters (1998, Half Moon)

Singles

See also
One-hit wonders in the UK
List of number-one singles from the 1970s (UK)
Classic Soul Ballads

References

External links

 

African-American musical groups
Musical groups established in 1976
Musical groups disestablished in 1982
Musical groups from Detroit
American rhythm and blues musical groups
1976 establishments in Michigan
1982 disestablishments in Michigan